The 22618 / 22617 SMVT Bengaluru - Tirupati Tri-weekly Intercity Express is an Express train belonging to Indian Railways Southern Railway zone that runs between  and  in India.

It used to operate from KSR Bengaluru till 1 October 2022 before being shifted to SMVT Bengaluru on 2 October 2022.

Coaches
The 22617 / 18 SMVT Bengaluru - Tirupati Intercity Express has one AC chair car, eight Chair car, 14 general unreserved & two SLR (seating with luggage rake) coaches . It does not carry a pantry car coach.

As is customary with most train services in India, coach composition may be amended at the discretion of Indian Railways depending on demand.

Service

This train has a rake sharing with 22615/16 Tirupati–Coimbatore Intercity Express.

Routing

References

External links
22617 Intercity Express at India Rail Info
22618 Intercity Express at India Rail Info

Intercity Express (Indian Railways) trains
Rail transport in Karnataka
Rail transport in Tamil Nadu
Rail transport in Andhra Pradesh
Transport in Bangalore
Transport in Tirupati